Louis Pfenninger (born 1 November 1944) is a former Swiss racing cyclist who won the Tour de Suisse in 1968 and 1972. He competed in the individual road race and team time trial events at the 1964 Summer Olympics and rode the Tour de France in 1967. He was the Swiss National Road Race champion in 1971.

References

1944 births
Living people
Swiss male cyclists
Tour de Suisse stage winners
Cyclists at the 1964 Summer Olympics
Olympic cyclists of Switzerland
People from Bülach
Sportspeople from the canton of Zürich